Baritius hampsoni is a moth of the subfamily Arctiinae. It was described by Paul Dognin in 1902. It is found in Costa Rica and Peru.

Subspecies
Baritius hampsoni hampsoni (Peru)
Baritius hampsoni flava Rothschild, 1935 (Costa Rica)

References

Phaegopterina
Moths described in 1907